Javier Benito González Arroyo is a Puerto Rican politician who served as the acting Secretary of State of Puerto Rico from October 2015 until December 2015, after the resignation of David Bernier. Prior to that, he served as Deputy Secretary of State of Puerto Rico. He is a member of the Popular Democratic Party (PDP).

On October 21, 2015 González, as Deputy Secretary of State, witnessed a deal with Taiwan that allowed citizens of both countries to obtain a driver's license in the other country.

González served as acting Secretary of State of Puerto Rico from October 30, 2015 until December 9, 2015. He was succeeded by Víctor Suárez.

References

External links
 Estado Libre Asociado de Puerto Rico

Date of birth missing (living people)
Living people
Secretaries of State of Puerto Rico
Popular Democratic Party (Puerto Rico) politicians
Democratic Party (Puerto Rico) politicians
Year of birth missing (living people)